George Eric Felton (3 February 1921 – 14 June 2019) was a British computer scientist. He undertook pioneering work in the field of operating systems and programming software and is the father of the GEORGE Operating System. He held the world record for the computation of π.

Early life, education, and military service 

George Felton was born in Paris in 1921 to English parents - his mother, Muriel Felton, worked at Bletchley Park during the war. He was brought up in Paris and Menton but moved to England following the early death of his father. Felton attended Bedford School and Magdalene College, Cambridge where he read the Mathematical Tripos. His university studies were interrupted by World War II during which Felton joined the RAF with a commission. Exploiting his interest in electronics he served as a Radar engineer and instructor. He was demobilised and returned to Cambridge in 1946. At Cambridge he met his wife Ruth Felton at meetings of The Round Country Dance society.

After commencing research in theoretical physics he switched his attention to Numerical Analysis and Programming, spurred on by his close contact with the construction of the EDSAC prototype computer in the Mathematical Laboratory, under Maurice Wilkes.

Career 

In 1951 Felton joined Elliott Brothers in Borehamwood where he designed the programming systems and wrote software for the Nicholas and Elliott 402 computers. From mid-1954 at Ferranti's London Computer Centre Felton led the team developing innovative and comprehensive operating system and programming software for the Ferranti Pegasus and Orion computers. Hugh McGregor Ross records that "George Felton tells how, when Pegasus was new, he would borrow a front door key on Friday evenings so he could get in during the weekends. Then, alone in the building, he would start up the computer to sum a series to calculate the value of π to a then record 10,024 decimal places. This was a good test of the reliability of Pegasus". His computations of π were records in their day 1957.  The team at Ferranti included  Bill Elliott, Conway Berners-Lee, Christopher Strachey, Charles Owen, Hugh Devonald, Henry Goodman and Derek Milledge.

The business computing division of Ferranti was merged with International Computers and Tabulators (ICT) in 1963, and ICT was in turn merged with English Electric Leo Marconi (EELM) computers in 1968 to form International Computers Limited (ICL). Following the mergers Felton ran the division responsible for the operating system and basic software for the 1900 Series. The new system was named George,  was based on ideas from the Orion and the spooling system of the Atlas computer.

Personal life 

Felton was also a notable photographer. He was a member of the Royal Photographic Society and had regular acceptances in its International Print Exhibition.  Examples of his work can be found online at the London Salon of Photography and at Arena Photographers.

He married Ruth A. R. Holt in Cambridge, 1951, and they had 4 sons. One of their sons, Matthew Felton, moved to the United States and became one of the designers of the Microsoft Windows NT operating system. Another son, Eric Felton, worked at ICL on CASE (Computer-Aided Software Engineering) tools.

Felton died in June 2019 at the age of 98.

Titles, honours, and awards 

 Fellow of the British Computer Society.
 Fujitsu Gold Medal for Computing 
 Fellow of the Royal Photographic Society.

Notes

References

External links 

 The 1962 edition of the Pegasus Programming Manual (38 MB PDF) by G. E. Felton, M.A. 
 The National Archives: The Ferranti Collection including: Pegasus Programming G.E. Felton of Ferranti Ltd. (Paper)
 Photograph with colleagues, including Conway Berners-Lee, (under Ferranti and ICL): George Felton is on the right of the picture, not identified in the caption

1921 births
2019 deaths
Alumni of Magdalene College, Cambridge
Computer companies of the United Kingdom
English computer scientists
Fellows of the British Computer Society
Fellows of the Royal Photographic Society
Royal Air Force officers
Royal Air Force personnel of World War II
British expatriates in France